The 1878 Argyllshire by-election was fought on 27 August 1878.  The byelection was fought due to the resignation of the incumbent Liberal Member of Parliament, the Marquess of Lorne to become Governor General of Canada. It was retained by Lorne's brother the Liberal candidate Lord Colin Campbell.

Expenses
Lord Campbell's expenses came to £5,700 9s 4d and Colonel Malcolm's were approximately £9,000.

References

Argyllshire by-election
1870s elections in Scotland
Politics of Argyll and Bute
Argyllshire
Argyllshire by-election
By-elections to the Parliament of the United Kingdom in Scottish constituencies
Argyllshire by-election